Florian Lapeyrade (born 9 August 1990) is a French professional rugby union player. He plays at prop for Bayonne in the Top 14.

References

External links
Ligue Nationale De Rugby Profile
European Professional Club Rugby Profile
Bayonne Profile

1990 births
French rugby union players
Living people
Rugby union props